Aleksejs Višņakovs (born 3 February 1984 in Riga) is a Latvian football midfielder, who currently plays for SK Super Nova in Latvian First League. He is also a member of Latvia national football team.

Club career

Latvia

As a youth player Višņakovs played for JFC Skonto. Being a promising youngster, in 2001 he was brought to the first team by that time manager Aleksandrs Starkovs. It was hard for the young player to fit in the squad, as he played only 2 matches in his first season with the club. After the season, he was given away to another club from Riga, this time FK Auda, playing in the Latvian First League. Višņakovs played 20 matches for them, scoring his first goal then. After showing some pretty good qualities, he was taken back to Skonto Riga and surely didn't disappoint this time. He had a long spell with the club that lasted for 5 years, from 2003 till 2008. During this time he became well known among the fans and was a vital player in the starting eleven, all in all making 139 appearances and scoring 31 goal. In 2009, he left the club, as his contract ended. Immediately after leaving, on 13 February 2009, he signed a contract with Skonto Riga rivals FK Ventspils. He played there for the next two seasons, also appearing in the UEFA Europa League group stages. All in all he played 43 matches, scoring 16 goals, becoming one of the league's top scorers.

Spartak Nalchik

After the successful season he was linked with a move to the Russian Premier League club Spartak Nalchik. In January 2011 he joined them on trial, and as it was successful, he signed a contract with them. Unfortunately, soon after the deal club's managers changed and as the new coach stated, Višņakovs was no more needed for the team, and Višņakovs was released.

Cracovia

Soon after leaving Nalchik Višņakovs went on trial with Cracovia, playing in the Polish Ekstraklasa. In February, 2011 he signed a two and a half-year contract with them, soon after joining already proving his qualities. Joining in the middle of the season, he played 14 matches and scored 3 goals, helping the club secure a place in the next year's Ekstraklasa. But the next season, Cracovia were relegated from Ekstraklasa and Višņakovs terminated his contract by a mutual agreement.

Baltika Kaliningrad

In July 2012 Višņakovs was about to sign a contract with the Latvian Higher League club Spartaks Jūrmala, but eventually the move fell through and Aleksejs joined the Russian First Division club Baltika Kaliningrad on 11 August 2012, signing a one-year contract. He played 17 matches for Baltika, scoring 2 goals. In July 2013 his contract was terminated by mutual consent and Višņakovs joined Spartaks Jūrmala on a short-term contract.

Widzew Łódź

In August 2013 Višņakovs went on trial with the Polish Ekstraklasa club Widzew Łódź and signed a one-year contract with them on 23 August 2013, becoming a teammate of his younger brother Eduards. Višņakovs scored his first goal for Widzew in a 1-1 league draw against Jagiellonia Białystok on 31 August 2013.

Zimbru Chișinău
On 9 August 2014 Višņakovs signed a contract for one year with Moldovan club Zimbru Chișinău.

Return to Latvia
Before the 2015 season Višņakovs returned to his first club Skonto. In February 2016 he joined RFS, a newly promoted club in Latvian Higher League.

Višņakovs joined Riga FC for the 2019 season.

International career 

Višņakovs made his debut for Latvia in 2004 against Oman, but he didn't participate in the EURO 2004 group stages. As of 19 March 2015, he has had 57 caps and 8 goals for the national team.

International goals
Scores and results list Latvia's goal tally first.

Personal life 

His younger brother Eduards is also a professional footballer, currently playing for Widzew Łódź in the Polish Ekstraklasa as a forward. While Aleksejs was a part of FK Ventspils squad, they also played together. They are the second pair of brothers to play for Widzew together after Lithuanians Artūras and Igoris Steško during the 2001-2002 season.

Honours

 Champion of Latvia (3) - 2001, 2003, 2004
Runner-up: 2005, 2009, 2010
 Latvian Cup (1) - 2001
Runner-up: 2006
 Baltic League (1) - 2009/2010
Runner-up: 2008
 Latvian young player of the year (2) - 2004, 2005
 Baltic Cup (1): 2008, 2012, 2014
Runner-up: 2005

References

External links

 
  

1984 births
Living people
Footballers from Riga
Latvian footballers
Skonto FC players
FK Ventspils players
MKS Cracovia (football) players
Widzew Łódź players
Ekstraklasa players
FC Baltika Kaliningrad players
Expatriate footballers in Russia
Latvian expatriate sportspeople in Russia
Latvia international footballers
Latvian expatriate footballers
Expatriate footballers in Poland
Latvian expatriate sportspeople in Poland
Latvian people of Russian descent
Association football midfielders
FK RFS players
FK Spartaks Jūrmala players
Riga FC players
FC Zimbru Chișinău players
Moldovan Super Liga players
Expatriate footballers in Moldova
Latvian expatriate sportspeople in Moldova